Khokhol is a rural locality (a selo) in Khokholskoye Urban Settlement, Khokholsky District, Voronezh Oblast, Russia. The population was  4,512 as of 2010. There are 40 streets.

Geography 
Khokhol is located 5 km southeast of Khokholsky (the district's administrative centre) by road. Khokholsky is the nearest rural locality.

References 

Rural localities in Khokholsky District